Ernando Rodrigues Lopes (born 17 April 1988 in Formosa), simply known as Ernando, is a former Brazilian footballer who plays as a centre back.

Career
Ernando made professional debut for Goiás in a 2–2 away draw against Botafogo in the Campeonato Brasileiro on 19 November 2006.  He scored his first professional goal in a 3–0 away win over the same club on 30 September of the following year.

Honours
Goiás
Campeonato Goiano: 2006, 2009, 2012, 2013
Campeonato Brasileiro Série B: 2012

Internacional
Campeonato Gaúcho: 2014, 2015, 2016
Recopa Gaúcha: 2017

Bahia
Campeonato Baiano: 2019

References

External links

1988 births
Living people
Sportspeople from Goiás
Brazilian footballers
Association football defenders
Campeonato Brasileiro Série A players
Campeonato Brasileiro Série B players
Goiás Esporte Clube players
Sport Club Internacional players
Sport Club do Recife players
Esporte Clube Bahia players
CR Vasco da Gama players